Tynedale RFC is a rugby union team based in Corbridge, Northumberland in North East England. The club was relegated from National League 1 in 2015, the third tier of the English rugby union system and have played in National League 2 North since.

History
The first match was against Elswick in 1876. In 1904 they won the Northumberland Senior Shield. 

In 2008 they were promoted to National Division Two.

Honours 
 Northumberland Senior Cup (24): 1887, 1906, 1911, 1914, 1927, 1933, 1934, 1935, 1936, 1948, 1988, 1992, 1993, 1996, 1999, 2000, 2003, 2004, 2005, 2006, 2008, 2009, 2010, 2014
 North Division 1 Division champions: 1999–00
 National League 3 North champions: 2007–08
 Hawick and Wilton Sevens Champions: 1885. (First ever winner of the tournament)
 Gala Sevens Champions: 1885
 Melrose Sevens Champions: 1886
 Glasgow City Sevens Champions: 2017

Facilities
Over  of land set in rural surround. The ground is adjacent to the River Tyne – a short walk over the bridge to the historical village of Corbridge. It has seven pitches, one fully floodlit training pitch (floodlighting adequate for 'junior' matches) and one smaller training pitch, fully floodlit – used for Colts training area. The ground has a modern, 400 seat grandstand, and there is also space for standing spectators around the pitch bringing total capacity to approximately 2,000.

Current standings

References

External links
 Official website

1876 establishments in England
Corbridge
English rugby union teams
Rugby clubs established in 1876
Rugby union clubs in Northumberland